Next Exit is an American manga-influenced comic series.

Next Exit may also refer to:
 Next Exit (album), a 1992 album by Grover Washington Jr.
 "Next Exit" (song), a song by Split Enz
 "Next Exit," a song by Interpol from their album Antics
 "Next Exit," a song by Unwound from their album Repetition
 Next Exit, a 2005 film starring Jorja Fox
 Next Exit (film), an upcoming American film